Boutigny-Prouais is a commune in the Eure-et-Loir department in northern France.

It consists of its two market towns, Boutigny-sur-Opton and Prouais, and its 14 hamlets, Allemant, Bauchêne, Beauterne,  Bouchemont,  Buchelet, Cloches, Dannemarie,  La Musse, Le Bois-des-Près, Le Mesnil-sur-Opton, Les Joncs, Saint-Projet, Rosay and Saussay.

Geography
The commune is geographical situated on the crossroads between the ‘Ile de France’ region, Lower Normandie region and the Centre region, only 60 km westwards of Paris. It is located between the towns of Houdan and Dreux on the border between the departments of Eure-et-Loir and Yvelines.

History 
The names Boutigny (Boteneium) and Prouais (Proeis) have been tracked back to the eleventh century in archives of the Eure-et-Loir department. However, tools that have been discovered on the banks of the Opton River and in the Musse hamlet dated back to prehistoric times confirm that the area has been occupied by men since ancient times.

The history of the two villages is linked to the vagaries of time with shared tragedies and destructions caused by invasions, epidemics, hunger, wars and climate conditions.

The wars did not spare the churches in Boutigny-sur-Opton and Prouais that were rebuilt or redesigned in the sixteenth century. Since those days, the tower of the church in Prouais has kept its charm as a military defence tower.  The church in Boutigny-sur-Opton  was devastated by a fire in 1947, but rebuilt to its glamour again in 1957.

From the nineteenth century, the boundaries of the commune have changed. In 1846, by order of King Louis Philippe, the commune of Saint-Project, with its hamlets  Le Mesnil-sur-Opton and Dannemarie, was united with Boutigny.  In 1972 the two communes Prouais and Boutigny were merged and became Boutigny-Proauis.  Boutigny-Prouais joined in 1998 the communality of communes of the county of Houdan (Communauté de communes du pays houdanais).

Population

See also
Communes of the Eure-et-Loir department

References

External links

 Official site

Communes of Eure-et-Loir